Simion Popescu (born 11 August 1940) is a retired Greco-Roman wrestler from Romania. He competed at the 1968 and 1972 Olympics and won a bronze medal in 1972. At the world championships he won a gold medal in 1969, placing second in 1967 and 1970. After retiring from competitions he worked as a wrestling coach at the club Rapid Bucuresti.

References

1940 births
Living people
Olympic wrestlers of Romania
Wrestlers at the 1968 Summer Olympics
Wrestlers at the 1972 Summer Olympics
Romanian male sport wrestlers
Olympic bronze medalists for Romania
Olympic medalists in wrestling
Medalists at the 1968 Summer Olympics
20th-century Romanian people